Beka Sheklashvili is a Georgian rugby union player. He plays for Georgia and for US Colomiers in Pro D2.

References

1986 births
Living people
Expatriate rugby union players from Georgia (country)
Expatriate rugby union players in France
Rugby union players from Georgia (country)
Georgia international rugby union players
US Colomiers players
Expatriate sportspeople from Georgia (country) in France
Rugby union props